Arne Berg may refer to:

 Arne Berg (cyclist) (1909–1997), Swedish road racing cyclist
 Arne Berg (ice hockey) (1931–2013), Norwegian ice hockey player
  (born 1945), Norwegian aviator in World War II